Viridiflorene synthase (EC 4.2.3.88,TPS31) is an enzyme with systematic name (2E,6E)-farnesyl-diphosphate diphosphate-lyase (viridiflorene-forming). This enzyme catalyses the following chemical reaction

 (2E,6E)-farnesyl diphosphate  viridiflorene + diphosphate

Viridiflorene is the only product of this enzyme from Solanum lycopersicum.

References

External links 
 

EC 4.2.3